Mavis Leslie de Trafford Gallant, née Young (11 August 1922 – 18 February 2014), was a Canadian writer who spent much of her life and career in France. Best known as a short story writer, she also published novels, plays and essays.

Personal life 
Gallant was born in Montreal, Quebec, the only child of Albert Stewart Roy de Trafford Young, a Canadian furniture salesman and painter who was the son of an officer in the British Army, and his wife, Benedictine Wiseman. Young died in 1932 of kidney disease, and his widow soon remarried and moved to New York, leaving their daughter behind with a guardian. Gallant did not learn of her father's death for several years and later told The New York Times: "I had a mother who should not have had children, and it's as simple as that."

Gallant was educated at 17 public, private, and convent schools in the United States and Canada. She spent most of the years 1935–1940 in and around New York City, the setting for many of her earlier stories.

She married John Gallant, a Winnipeg musician, in 1942. The couple divorced in 1947. According to Gallant's biographer, the marriage was "briefer than the dates suggest since her husband was in the armed forces overseas for much of the time".

Career
In her 20s, Gallant briefly worked for the National Film Board before taking a job as a reporter for the Montreal Standard (1944–1950). While working for the Standard, she published some of her early short stories, both in the newspaper and in the magazines Preview and Northern Review.

Gallant left journalism in 1950 to pursue fiction writing full-time. She moved to Europe with the hope of being able to work exclusively as a writer rather than supporting herself with other work, and lived briefly in Spain before settling in Paris, France, where she resided for the remainder of her life. Despite residing in Paris, Gallant never surrendered her Canadian citizenship nor applied for French citizenship.

Her first internationally published short story, "Madeline's Birthday", appeared in the September 1, 1951 issue of The New Yorker. The magazine soon published other stories of hers, including "One Morning in June" and "The Picnic". She did not initially know these later stories had been accepted by the magazine, as her literary agent, Jacques Chambrun, pocketed her $1,535 in royalties and told her the magazine had declined her stories, while simultaneously lying about her residence to the magazine so they could not contact her directly; she discovered that she had been published only upon seeing her name in the magazine while reading it in a library, and thus established her longstanding relationship with the magazine by directly contacting and befriending New Yorker fiction editor William Maxwell. Chambrun had also embezzled money from W. Somerset Maugham, Ben Hecht, Grace Metalious, and Jack Schaefer, among others.

She published 116 stories in The New Yorker throughout her career, putting her in the same league as John Cheever or John Updike. Alongside Alice Munro, Gallant is one of only a few Canadian authors whose works have regularly appeared in the magazine.

She wrote two novels, Green Water, Green Sky (1959) and A Fairly Good Time (1970); a play, What Is to Be Done? (1984); numerous celebrated collections of stories, The Other Paris (1956), My Heart Is Broken (1964), The Pegnitz Junction (1973), The End of the World and Other Stories (1974), From the Fifteenth District (1979), Home Truths: Selected Canadian Stories (1981), Overhead in a Balloon: Stories of Paris (1985), In Transit (1988) and Across the Bridge (1993); and a non-fiction work, Paris Notebooks: Selected Essays and Reviews (1986). Numerous new collections of stories from the earlier books, including The Selected Stories of Mavis Gallant (1996), Paris Stories (2002) and Varieties of Exile (2003), were also released in the 1990s and 2000s. The Cost of Living (2009) collected stories from throughout her career, which had been published in literary magazines but not in earlier collections. Her "Linnet Muir" series of stories, which appeared in several of her books before being collected in their entirety in Home Truths, are her most explicitly semi-autobiographical works.

Throughout Gallant's early career, Canadian literary critics often wrote of her as being unfairly overlooked in Canada because of her expatriate status; prior to the 1970s, in fact, her books were not picked up by Canadian publishers at all, and were available only as rare and expensive American imports until Macmillan of Canada bought publication rights to From the Fifteenth District. According to journalist Robert Fulford, the neglect flowed in both directions, as Gallant did not actually undertake any serious effort to secure a Canadian publisher until Macmillan editor Douglas Gibson approached her in the late 1970s. The Canadian publication of From the Fifteenth District did not initially quell the criticism, however, as the book failed to garner a shortlisted nomination for the Governor General's Award for English-language fiction despite being widely regarded as her greatest work. In response, Gibson compiled Home Truths: Selected Canadian Stories, a collection of previously published stories selected to highlight the Canadian themes and settings present in her work. That volume won the Governor General's Award for English-language fiction in 1981.

She only rarely granted interviews until 2006, when she participated in two television documentaries: one in English for Bravo! Canada, Paris Stories: The Writing of Mavis Gallant, and one in French as part of the series CONTACT, l'encyclopédie de la création, hosted by Canadian broadcaster Stéphan Bureau. Gallant was honored at Symphony Space in New York City on November 1, 2006, in an event for Selected Shorts—fellow authors Russell Banks, Jhumpa Lahiri and Michael Ondaatje honoured her and read excerpts from her work, and Gallant herself made a rare personal appearance, reading one of her short stories in its entirety.

Gallant's private journals were slated for publication by McClelland and Stewart and Knopf, with the first volume covering the period from 1952 to 1969, but as of 2023 have yet to appear. Some excerpts from the diaries were published by The New Yorker in 2012.

Gallant was candid about her desire for autonomy and privacy. In an interview with Geoff Hancock in Canadian Fiction magazine in 1978, she discussed her "life project" and her deliberate move to France to write by saying, "I have arranged matters so that I would be free to write. It's what I like doing." In the preface to her collection Home Truths: Selected Canadian Stories (1981), she used the words of Boris Pasternak as her epigraph: "Only personal independence matters."

Death
Gallant died, aged 91, on February 18, 2014.

Critical assessment
Grazia Merler observes in her book, Mavis Gallant: Narrative Patterns and Devices, that "Psychological character development is not the heart of Mavis Gallant's stories, nor is plot. Specific situation development and reconstruction of the state of mind or of heart is, however, the main objective." Frequently, Gallant's stories focus on expatriate men and women who have come to feel lost or isolated; marriages that have grown flimsy or shabby; lives that have faltered and now hover in the shadowy area between illusion, self-delusion, and reality. Because of her heritage and understanding of Acadian history, she is often compared to Antonine Maillet, considered to be a spokesperson for Acadian culture in Canada.

In her critical book Reading Mavis Gallant, Janice Kulyk Keefer says: "Gallant is a writer who dazzles us with her command of the language, her innovative use of narrative forms, the acuity of her intelligence, and the incisiveness of her wit. Yet she also disconcerts us with her insistence on the constrictions and limitations that dominate human experience."

In a review of her work in Books in Canada in 1978, Geoff Hancock asserts that "Mavis Gallant's fiction is among the finest ever written by a Canadian. But, like buried treasure, both the author and her writing are to discover." In the Canadian Reader, Robert Fulford writes: "One begins comparing her best moments to those of major figures in literary history. Names like Henry James, Chekhov, and George Eliot dance across the mind."

Depiction of fascism
Fascism is a recurring subject in Gallant's stories. Critics have also singled out Gallant's later story "Speck's Idea" (1979) as offering a sustained engagement with the psychological appeal of fascism. The story, which is Gallant's most widely anthologized work and has been called "arguably her masterpiece," depicts an art dealer in 1970s France who seems to slowly embrace fascism. At the same time, there are details in the story that seem to undermine his association with fascist ideology.

According to critic Andy Lamey, the protagonist of "Speck's Idea" should indeed be viewed as a fascist, "but of a particular, non-ideological type." In the 1970s, France was undergoing a debate about the country's collaboration with its Nazi occupiers during World War II. Lamey offers historical material to suggest that Gallant's story is informed by this debate. He characterizes "Speck's Idea" as a "dramatization of how a segment of the French population, which its central character represents, could tolerate and condone fascism for reasons other than a deep attraction to fascist ideas. These reasons include indifference and self-interest. Gallant's protagonist ultimately illustrates how fascism drew not merely on ideological, but also on opportunistic, motivations."

Bibliography

Novellas and short stories
 The Other Paris (Houghton Mifflin, 1956).
 My Heart Is Broken: Eight Stories and a Short Novel (Random House, 1964).
 The Pegnitz Junction: A Novella and Five Short Stories (1973)
 The End of the World and Other Stories (1974)
 From the Fifteenth District: A Novella and Eight Short Stories (1979)
 Home Truths: Selected Canadian Stories (1981)
Overhead in a Balloon: Stories of Paris (1985)
 In Transit: Twenty Stories (1988)
Across the Bridge: Stories (1993)
 The Moslem Wife and Other Stories (1994)

Compilations 

The Collected Stories of Mavis Gallant (1996, Random House); The Selected Stories of Mavis Gallant (1996, McClelland & Stewart).
Paris Stories (2002, New York Review Books)
Varieties of Exile (2003, New York Review Books); Montreal Stories (2004, McClelland & Stewart).
Going Ashore: Stories (2009, McClelland & Stewart). 31 previously uncollected stories.
The Cost of Living: Early and Uncollected Stories (2009, New York Review Books). 19 stories from Going Ashore, and an additional story, "Rose".

Novels
 Green Water, Green Sky (Houghton Mifflin, 1959).
 A Fairly Good Time (Random House, 1970).

Plays
 What Is to Be Done?, 1983

Non-fiction
 Paris Notebooks: Essays and Reviews, 1986

Awards and honors
In 1981, Gallant was named an Officer of the Order of Canada for her contribution to literature. She was promoted to Companion of the Order in 1993.

In 1983-84, she returned to Canada to be the writer-in-residence at the University of Toronto. In 1989, Gallant was made a Foreign Honorary Member of the American Academy of Arts and Letters. Queen's University awarded her an honorary LL.D. in 1991, and the Quebec Writers' Federation Awards committee has named its annual non-fiction literary award in her honor. She served on the jury of the Giller Prize in 1997.

In 2000, Gallant won the Matt Cohen Prize, and in 2002 she received the Rea Award for the Short Story. The O. Henry Prize Stories of 2003 was dedicated to her.  In 2004, Gallant was awarded a Lannan Literary Fellowship as well as a PEN/Nabokov Award.

On November 8, 2006, Gallant received the Prix Athanase-David from the government of her native province of Quebec. She was the first author writing in English to receive this award in its 38 years of existence.

In popular culture
In 2018, the Pakistani-American author Sadia Shepard was accused of having copied Gallant's short story "The Ice Wagon Coming Down the Street" in her story "Foreign-Returned".

Director Wes Anderson based one of the stories in his 2021 film The French Dispatch on "The Events in May: A Paris Notebook", a two-part New Yorker story written by Gallant.  A fictional reporter inspired by Gallant was portrayed in the film by actress Frances McDormand.

References

External links

1922 births
2014 deaths
Canadian women novelists
Canadian women journalists
Companions of the Order of Canada
Writers from Paris
Writers from Montreal
Fellows of the Royal Society of Literature
Anglophone Quebec people
University of Toronto people
Prix Athanase-David winners
Governor General's Award-winning fiction writers
PEN/Nabokov Award winners
20th-century Canadian women writers
21st-century Canadian women writers
20th-century Canadian novelists
Canadian expatriates in France
Canadian newspaper journalists
Canadian women dramatists and playwrights
20th-century Canadian dramatists and playwrights
Canadian women essayists
Canadian people of Romanian descent
Canadian people of English descent
Canadian women short story writers
20th-century Canadian short story writers
21st-century Canadian short story writers
20th-century Canadian essayists
21st-century Canadian essayists
Canadian expatriate writers
Members of the American Academy of Arts and Letters